Masies de Llaràs or Masies de Llaras is a locality located in the municipality of Baix Pallars, in Province of Lleida province, Catalonia, Spain. As of 2020, it has a population of 5.

Geography 
Masies de Llaràs is located 122km north-northeast of Lleida.

References

Populated places in the Province of Lleida